Calvin Alan Byrd (born December 17, 1981), professionally known by his stage name 40 Cal, is an American rapper. He was a member of Harlem-based hip-hop group The Diplomats.

40 Cal made his first appearance on the self-titled theme song, "40 Cal" for the Dipset album Diplomatic Immunity 2. He took a part on MTV2's Fight Klub MC battles.

Personal life 
Byrd’s daughter, Saniyya Dennis, went missing from Buffalo, New York on April 24, 2021 and was last seen in her Buffalo State College residence hall. On May 5, 2021, Erie County District Attorney John Flynn announced that she may have committed suicide after search dogs picked up her scent in rocky terrain, but couldn't locate her body.

Discography

Studio albums

Street LPs 
2006: Trigger Happy
2007: Trigger Happy 2
2008: The Yellow Tape
2008: Leader of the New School

EPs 
2008: Harlem Shuffle EP
2011: Trigga Happy 3 a.k.a. Trigganometry (EP)

Mixtapes 
2006: 40 to Life
2007: 40 to Life Part 2
2008: Dip Masters Collection
2009: Da Carter After Nino, Like New Jack
2011: God's Gift to an iPod
2011: Rap Sheet
2012: Watch The Chrome
2012: Target Practice
2012: 2nd Hand Smoke

Guest appearances
Friday the 13 contributing artist 40 cal, A-lox (track 2)

References 

40 Cal Is Now Managed By Masar (Max B Engineer & Designer) 1st-n-o

External links 
 Video: 40 Cal Interview Says Dipset Is Not Over
 Hiphopgame Interview with 40

1979 births
Living people
Gangsta rappers
People from Harlem
American male rappers
The Diplomats members
Rappers from Manhattan
African-American male rappers
21st-century American rappers